Hütteldorf (Central Bavarian: Hittldorf) is a part of Vienna's 14th district, Penzing. It is located in the west of Vienna, in the geographical center of the district, stretching roughly from Deutschordenstraße (which forms the border to Baumgarten) in the east to Wolf in der Au in the west, where Hütteldorf borders Hadersdorf-Weidlingau.

Hütteldorf is well known throughout Austria and beyond as the site of the Gerhard-Hanappi-Stadion, the stadium in which Rapid Vienna hosts its home games. It is also known for the Wien Hütteldorf railway station near the stadium, where most long-distance trains operating on the West railway stop, as it offers good connections to Vienna's subway system (line U4) and suburban train routes.

Penzing (Vienna)
Geography of Vienna